The 1948 U.S. National Championships (now known as the US Open) was a tennis tournament that took place on the outdoor grass courts in the United States. The men's and women's singles events as well as the mixed doubles were held at the West Side Tennis Club, Forest Hills in New York City, while the men's and women's doubles events were played at the Longwood Cricket Club in Chestnut Hill, Massachusetts. The tournament ran from 10 September until 19 September. It was the 68th staging of the U.S. National Championships, and the fourth Grand Slam tennis event of the year. Pancho Gonzales and Margaret Osborne duPont won the singles titles.

Finals

Men's singles

 Pancho Gonzales defeated   Eric Sturgess  6–2, 6–3, 14–12

Women's singles

 Margaret Osborne duPont defeated  Louise Brough  4–6, 6–4, 15–13

Men's doubles

 Gardnar Mulloy /  Bill Talbert defeated  Frank Parker /  Ted Schroeder 1–6, 9–7, 6–3, 3–6, 9–7

Women's doubles

 Louise Brough /  Margaret Osborne duPont defeated  Patricia Todd /  Doris Hart 6–4, 8–10, 6–1

Mixed doubles

 Louise Brough /   Tom Brown defeated  Margaret Osborne duPont /  Bill Talbert 6–4, 6–4

References

External links
Official US Open website

 
U.S. National Championships
U.S. National Championships (tennis) by year
U.S. National Championships (tennis)
U.S. National Championships
U.S. National Championships